Adafroptilum is a genus of moths in the family Saturniidae first described by Philippe Darge in 2004.

Species
Adafroptilum acuminatum (Darge, 2003)
Adafroptilum acutum (Darge, Naumann & Brosch, 2003)
Adafroptilum austriorientale Darge, 2008
Adafroptilum bellum (Darge, Naumann & Brosch, 2003)
Adafroptilum coloratum (Darge, Naumann & Brosch, 2003)
Adafroptilum convictum Darge, 2007
Adafroptilum hausmanni Darge, 2007
Adafroptilum incanum (Sonthonnax, 1899)
Adafroptilum indivisum (Darge, 2003)
Adafroptilum kitongaensis Darge, 2006
Adafroptilum lejorai Darge, 2005
Adafroptilum mikessensis Darge, 2007
Adafroptilum occidaneum Darge, 2008
Adafroptilum permixtum (Darge, 2003)
Adafroptilum quinquevitreatum Darge, 2005
Adafroptilum rotundum (Darge, 2003)
Adafroptilum rougerii Darge, 2006
Adafroptilum scheveni (Darge, 2003)
Adafroptilum schmiti Darge, 2005
Adafroptilum septiguttata (Weymer, 1903)
Adafroptilum singularum (Darge, Naumann & Brosch, 2003)
Adafroptilum sommereri Darge, 2005
Adafroptilum tricoronatum (Darge, Naumann & Brosch, 2003)
Adafroptilum tuberculatum (Darge, Naumann & Brosch, 2003)

References

Saturniinae
Moth genera